Make a Star is the second EP album by Italian industrial rock band Dope Stars Inc. It was released on August 4, 2006. Following suit of their previous albums, the EP was released under the Trisol Music Group label as well as being distributed by Metropolis Records in North America and Canada, with other labels distributing in other countries. Thomas Rainer, who produced their last album, returned to produce along with Bernd Mazzagg and Markus Jäger.

Background

Following the release of Make a Star, Dope Stars Inc. were already signed for a record deal with Trisol Music Group to produce one more album. The album, Gigahearts, was recorded shortly after and released later in 2006. Rather than keeping Thomas Rainer as a producer for a third time, Victor Love used his knowledge gained from working with him to produce the album himself.

Track listing

Personnel
Creative personnel us as follows:

Band
 Victor Love – lead vocals, guitar, drum machine, synthesizer
 Alex Vega – guitar
 Darin Yevonde – bass guitar
 Grace Khold – artwork

Extra instruments
 Markus Jäger – bass guitar, guitar
 Alexander Kaschte – guitar
 Thomas Rainer – Male vocals
 Luisa Thum – Female vocals

Production
 Markus Jäger – producer, recording
 Alexander Kaschte – composer, programming, mixing
 Bo Kondren – mastering
 Victor Love – songwriting, mixing, recording, programming
 Bernd Mazzagg – producer, arranging, mixing, programming, recording
 Thomas Rainer – producer

Artwork
 Grace Khold – graphic design, art direction, layout
 Eolo Perfido – photography

References

External links
 

Dope Stars Inc. albums
2006 EPs